American rapper Lil Tjay has released two studio albums, three extended plays and 40 singles (including fourteen as a featured artist).

Studio albums

Extended plays

Singles

As lead artist

As featured artist

Other charted and certified songs

Guest appearances

Notes

References

External links
 
 
 
 

Discographies of American artists